Viktor Antonovich Avdyushko (Russian: Виктор Антонович Авдюшко; January 11, 1925 – November 19, 1975) was a Soviet actor and a People's Artist of the Russian SFSR.

Biography

Early life
Avdyushko was born to a father who worked as a weight inspector in the Kiyevsky Rail Terminal and to a housewife mother, who also raised one older daughter. Initially a student in the Moscow Aviation Institute, he left it and was admitted into the All-Union State Institute of Cinematography, where he studied under Yuli Raizman. He graduated from the academy in 1949, and joined the regular cast of the Mosfilm studio.

Breakthrough
He made his debut on screen with a minor role in Sergei Gerasimov's 1948 film The Young Guard. Avdyushko continued to play supporting characters during the following years, in pictures such as Cossacks of the Kuban and Hostile Whirlwinds. He was given his first major appearance in the 1955 Heroes of Shipka, when he depicted the Russian soldier Osnobishin.

In 1957, Avdyushko was cast for the leading role in Mikhail Schweitzer's Tight Knot, adapted from a story by Vladimir Tendryakov. He portrayed Pavel Mansurov, an idealist Kolkhoz general secretary who is corrupted by the power of his office. The film had to be heavily censured in order to be released, and its title was changed to Sasha Comes to Life. The full version was only released in 1988.

Summit
The actor starred in many films during the 1960s and early 1970s, and performed in fifty until the end of his career, including the 1961 Biennale Jury Prize winning Peace to Him Who Enters and the 1964 The Alive and the Dead, based on Konstantin Simonov's novel. He also worked with foreign studios, mainly East Germany's DEFA: He played in Konrad Wolf's 1958 Sun Seekers and in Frank Beyer's 1963 Naked among Wolves. In 1972, he appeared in The Dawns Here Are Quiet, which was nominated for the Academy Award for Best Foreign Film.

On 26 November 1965, Avdyushko was awarded the title Meritorious Artist of the Russian SFSR. On 28 March 1974, he was granted the title of a People's Artist of the RSFSR  He was married to Estonian actress Liina Orlova, with whom he had one daughter, future actress Marija Avdyushko-Taska.

In early 1975, as he was working on a picture in Vladivostok during winter, Avdyushko entered the cold ocean water for a scene. He developed severe Pleural empyema, of which he died seven months later. He is buried in the Vagankovo Cemetery.

Selected filmography
The Young Guard (1948) as worker
Cossacks of the Kuban (1949) as stableman
Hostile Whirlwinds (1953) as Kovalyov
Heroes of Shipka (1955) as Osnobishin
Sun Seekers (1958) as Sergei Melnikov
Fathers and Sons (1958) as Sergei Melnikov
Peace to Him Who Enters (1961) as Yamschikov
Naked among Wolves (1963) as Leonid Bogorski
Introduction to Life (1963) as Bobrov
An Ordinary Miracle (1964) as innkeeper
The Alive and the Dead (1964) as Sergeant Shestakov
Thirty Three (1965) as Misha
The Red and the White (1967) as sailor
Liberation (1970) as Maximov
The Dawns Here Are Quiet (1972) as assistant platoon commander
Soldiers of Freedom (1977) as Marshal Ivan Konev

References

External links

1925 births
1975 deaths
Male actors from Moscow
Soviet male film actors
Honored Artists of the RSFSR
People's Artists of the RSFSR
Deaths from pneumonia in the Soviet Union
Burials at Vagankovo Cemetery
Gerasimov Institute of Cinematography alumni